Cường Lợi may refer to several places in Vietnam, including:

Cường Lợi, Bắc Kạn, a rural commune of Na Rì District
, a rural commune of Đình Lập District